Bartholomew and the Bug is a children's picture book by Neal Layton, published in 2004. It won the Nestlé Smarties Book Prize Bronze Award.

Reception 
A Kirkus Reviews review says: "A lighthearted take on mortality, as well as the old truth that travel is a broadening experience."

Bartholomew and The Bug is the Smarties Prize Bronze Award Winner.

References

British picture books
2004 children's books
Books about bears